Nebria fischeri is a species of ground beetle from Nebriinae subfamily that can be found in Georgia and Turkey.

References

fischeri
Beetles described in 1836
Beetles of Asia